= Kampung Sibigol =

- Location within Borneo
- Coordinates: 1.65°N 109.8°E
- Country: Malaysia
- State: Sarawak
- Elevation: 2 m (6.6 ft)

Kampung Sibigol is a settlement in Sarawak, Malaysia. It lies approximately 59.8 kilometres (37 mi) west of the state capital Kuching.

Neighbouring settlements include:

- Kampung Busang 1.9 kilometres (1.2 mi) west
- Kampung Perundang 1.9 kilometres (1.2 mi) east
- Kampung Titiakar 1.9 kilometres (1.2 mi) north
- Kampung Rukam 2.6 kilometres (1.6 mi) northwest
- Kampung Menera 2.6 kilometres (1.6 mi) southwest
- Tanjan 3.7 kilometres (2.3 mi) west
